Nuttawut Khamrin (born March 27, 1991) is a Thai professional footballer who plays as a right back and right winger for Thai League 2 club Nongbua Pitchaya.

Honour
Nongbua Pitchaya
 Thai League 2 champions: 2020–21

References

External links

1991 births
Living people
Nuttawut Khamrin
Nuttawut Khamrin
Association football fullbacks
Nuttawut Khamrin
Nuttawut Khamrin
Nuttawut Khamrin
Nuttawut Khamrin
Nuttawut Khamrin
Nuttawut Khamrin
Nuttawut Khamrin
Nuttawut Khamrin